Oberea ferruginea is a species of beetle in the family Cerambycidae. It was described by Thunberg in 1787.

Varietas
 Oberea ferruginea var. prolixa Pascoe, 1867
 Oberea ferruginea var. semiargentata Pic, 1923

References

ferruginea
Beetles described in 1787